Koro–Olrat is a Glottolog classification that includes the following two languages of Gaua Island, Vanuatu:
 Koro language (Vanuatu), an Oceanic language spoken on Gaua island
 Olrat language, a moribund Oceanic language spoken on Gaua island

References 

Glottolog languages that correspond to more than one Wikipedia article